Satellite or SAT chromosomes are chromosomes that contain secondary constructs that serve as identification. They are observed in Acrocentric chromosomes.  In addition to the centromere, one or more secondary constrictions can be observed in some chromosomes at metaphase. These chromosomes are called satellite chromosomes. In humans it is usually associated with the short arm of an acrocentric chromosome, such as in the chromosomes 13, 14, 15, 21, & 22. The Y chromosome can also contain satellites, although these are thought to be translocations from autosomes. The secondary constriction always keeps its position, so it can be used as markers to identify specific chromosomes. 

The name derives from the small chromosomal segment behind the secondary constriction, called a satellite, named by Sergei Navashin, in 1912. Later, Heitz (1931) qualified the secondary constriction as the SAT state (Sine Acid Thymonucleinico, which means "without thymonucleic acid"), because it didn't stain with the Feulgen reaction. With time, the term "SAT-chromosome" simply became a synonym and also an abbreviation for satellite chromosome. 

The satellite at metaphase appears to be attached to the chromosomes by a thread of chromatin. 

SAT-chromosomes whose secondary constriction is associated with the formation of the nucleolus are referred to as nucleolar SAT-chromosomes. There are at least 4 SAT chromosomes in each diploid nucleus, and the constriction corresponds to a nucleolar organizer (NOR), a region containing multiple copies of the 18S and 28S ribosomal genes that synthesize ribosomal RNA required by ribosomes. The appearance of secondary constrictions at NORs is thought to be due to rRNA transcription and/or structural features of the nucleolus impeding chromosome condensation.

References

Chromosomes